The Linguistic Society of the Philippines, Inc. (or LSP) is a learned society for linguists and language educators based in Manila, Philippines. It was founded in 1969 primarily to rally for increased domestic research work on Philippine languages. The organization currently hosts and co-hosts local and international conferences and three memorial lectures. The LSP also publishes its own international peer-reviewed scholarly journal entitled the Philippine Journal of Linguistics (PJL).

Among notable people involved with the organization were linguists R. David Zorc and Lawrence A. Reid and former Department of Education, Culture and Sports secretary Andrew Gonzalez. For years, the LSP has also been an active partner of SIL International, known publisher of the Ethnologue.

History
The organization was the brainchild of Dr. Bonifacio Sibayan of the Philippine Normal College (now a university) and Dr. Ernesto Constantino of the University of the Philippines, two linguists who were working on their respective research projects in the Pacific and Asian Languages Institute of the University of Hawaii in 1968. Far away from home and very conscious of the linguistic work going on in the US, they had several discussions on the need for an organization of linguists that would do research and write on Philippine languages. The Linguistic Society of the Philippines (popularly known as the LSP) was formally organized in school year 1969-1970, with Teodoro Llamzon (Ateneo de Manila) as president, Bonifacio Sibayan (PNC) as vice-president, Edilberto Dagot (PNC) as secretary, and Fe Otanes (PNC) as treasurer.

Several LSP members appeared before the Constitutional Convention of 1971 and again before the Constitutional Commission in 1986 to discuss the national language issue. The LSP was also involved in the formulation of the Bilingual Education Policy in 1974 and conducted a formal evaluation of its implementation for the period 1974 to 1985; based on the results of that evaluation, the Policy was revised in 1987.

Research
Beginning from research on Philippine languages, the LSP has expanded its scope of research. The organization accommodates various studies related to linguistics and language education such as:
 Descriptive linguistics
 Comparative linguistics
 Historical linguistics
 Areal linguistics 
 Sociolinguistics
 Psycholinguistics
 Anthropological linguistics
 Applied linguistics
 Language teaching

Organization
From 2015 to 2018, the LSP is handled by a group of elected scholars and academicians from various institutions in the Philippines.

Officers

Board of Directors

References

External links
 Homepage

Organizations established in 1969
Organizations based in Manila
Linguistics organizations
Linguistic societies